Tachash (Jewish) – Large land animal
 Tailypo (American Folklore) (Appalachia) – Powerful animal, that takes revenge on those who steal its tail   
 Taimatsumaru (Japanese) – Tengu surrounded in demonic fire
 Takam (Persian) – Nature spirit
 Taka-onna (Japanese) – Female spirit which can stretch itself to peer into the second story of a building
 Talos (Greek) – Giant made of bronze
 Tangie (Scottish) – Shapeshifting water spirit
 Taniwha (Māori) – Water spirit
 Tantankororin (Japanese) – Unharvested persimmon which becomes a monster
 Tanuki (Japanese) – Shapeshifting raccoon dog
 Taotao Mona (Mariana Islands) – Ancestral spirits
 Taotie (Chinese) – Greed spirit
 Tapairu (Mangaia) – Nature spirit
 Tapio (Finnish) – Forest deity
 Tarantasio (Italian) – Dragon
 Tarasque (French) – Dragon with leonine, turtle, bear, and human attributes
 Tartalo (Basque) – One-eyed giant
 Tartaruchi (Christian) – Demonic punisher
 Tatami-tataki (Japanese) – Poltergeist that hits the tatami mats at night
 Tatzelwurm – (Alpine Folklore) lizard-like creature, often described as having the face of a cat, with a serpent-like body which may be slender or stubby, with four short legs or two forelegs
 Tatsu – Japanese dragon
 Taurokampoi (Etruscan) – Fish-tailed bull
 Tavara (Trabzon) – Night-demon
 Teju Jagua (Guaraní) – Lizard with seven dog heads
 Tecumbalam (Mayan) – Bird
 Tek-ko-kui (Taiwanese) – Bamboo ghost
 Tengu (Japanese) – Anthropomorphic bird
 Tennin (Japanese) – Angelic humanoid
 Te-no-me (Japanese) – Ghost of a blind man, with his eyes on his hands
 Tepegoz (Azerbaijani) – Azerbaijani mythical creature similar to the cyclops Polyphemus
 Terrible Monster (Jewish) – Lion-eagle-scorpion hybrid made from the blood of murder victims
 Teumessian Fox (Greek) – Gigantic fox
 Theriocephalus (Medieval folklore) – Animal-headed humanoid
 Three hares (Many cultures worldwide) – Symbolic animal
 Three-legged bird (Asia and Africa) – Solar bird
 Thunderbird (Native American) – Avian lightning bird spirit
 Thor (Norse mythology) – God of thunder and storm
 Tiangou (Chinese) – Meteoric dog
 Tianlong (Chinese) – Celestial dragon
 Tibicena (Canarian) – Evil dog
 Tiddy Mun (English) – Bog spirit
 Tigmamanukan (Philippine) – Asian fairy bluebird
 Tigre Capiangos (Argentine) – Jaguar-human shapeshifter
 Tigris (Jewish) – Giant lion
 Tikbalang (Philippine) – Anthropomorphic horse
 Tikoloshe (Zulu) – Little people and water spirit
 Timingila (Hindu) – Sea monster
 Tipua (Māori) – Spirit that protects a specific place
 Titan (Greek) – Primeval god
 Tiyanak (Philippine) – Demons that are souls of dead unbaptized babies
 Tizheruk (Inuit) – Sea serpent
 Tlahuelpuchi (Tlaxcalan) – Shapeshifting vampire
 Tōfu-kozō (Japanese) – Spirit child carrying a block of tofu
 Toire-no-Hanakosan (Japanese) – Ghost who lurks in grade school restroom stalls
 Tomte (Scandinavian) – House spirit
 Topielec (Slavic) – Water spirit
 Tōtetsu (Japanese) – Greed spirit
 Toyol (Malay) – Servant spirit
 Trasgo (Spanish and Portuguese) – Grotesque, mischievous little people
 Trauco (Chilota) – Fertility spirit
 Trenti (Cantabrian) – Diminutive demon
 Trickster – Character in a story which exhibits a great degree of intellect or secret knowledge, and uses it to play tricks or otherwise disobey normal rules and conventional behaviour
 Tripurasura (Hindu) – Demonic inhabitants of Tripura
 Tritons (Greek) – Male human-fish hybrid
 Troll (Norse) – Nature spirit
 Trow (Orkney and Shetland) – Little people and nature spirits
 Tsi-noo (Abenaki) – Vampiric demon
 Tsuchigumo (Japanese) – Shapeshifting, giant spider
 Tsuchinoko (Japanese) – Plump snake-like creature
 Tsukumogami (Japanese) – Inanimate object that becomes animated after existing for 100 years
 Tsul 'Kalu (Cherokee) – Giant nature spirit
 Tsurara-onna (Japanese) – Icicle woman
 Tsurube-otoshi (Japanese) – Monster which drops or lowers a bucket from the top of a tree to catch people
 Tugarin Zmeyevich (Slavic) – Evil shapeshifter
 Tylwyth Teg (Welsh) – Nature spirit
 Tupilaq (Inuit) – Animated construct
 Turehu (Māori) – Pale spirit
 Türst (Swiss) – legendary figure who turns people into dogs 
 Turul (Hungarian) – Giant falcon that helped shape the origins of the Magyars
 Tyger (Heraldry) – Like a real tiger, but lacks stripes; has the tufted tail of a lion and a thick mane along the neck like a horse
 Typhon (Greek) – Winged, snake-legged giant
 Tzitzimitl (Aztec) – Skeletal star spirit

T